Wu Qing (born March 25, 1988) is a Paralympic athlete from China competing in throwing events in the F36 cerebral palsy classification. , Wu holds F36 World Records for shot put, discus and javelin.

Wu began competing in athletics in 2005. and made her international debut at the 2008 Summer Paralympics in Beijing, China. There she won gold medals in both the women's F35-38 javelin throw and the F35-36 discus throw event.  She also finished second in the women's shot put - F35-36.

At the 2012 Summer Paralympics in London, Wu competed in F35-F36 shot put and discus events. In the shot put event, she broke the World Record for her F36 classification; she was awarded bronze behind F35 competitors Mariia Pomazan and Wang Jun  who broke the World Record for their own classification. In the discus throw, Wu set a new F36 world record to win the event. A scoring error saw Mariia Pomazan initially presented with the gold medal, then being told to return it.

Outside of sport, Wu's hobbies include embroidery and listening to music.

External links

References 

1988 births
Paralympic athletes of China
Athletes (track and field) at the 2008 Summer Paralympics
Athletes (track and field) at the 2012 Summer Paralympics
Athletes (track and field) at the 2016 Summer Paralympics
Paralympic gold medalists for China
Paralympic silver medalists for China
Paralympic bronze medalists for China
Living people
Chinese female discus throwers
Chinese female shot putters
Chinese female javelin throwers
World record holders in Paralympic athletics
Cerebral Palsy category Paralympic competitors
Medalists at the 2008 Summer Paralympics
Medalists at the 2012 Summer Paralympics
Medalists at the 2016 Summer Paralympics
Paralympic medalists in athletics (track and field)
Athletes (track and field) at the 2020 Summer Paralympics
21st-century Chinese women